Poecilus cupreus is a species of ground beetle native to the Palearctic (including Europe). In Europe, it is found in almost every country, and is only absent in a number of small states and islands: Andorra, the Azores, the Canary Islands, the Channel Islands, the Cyclades Islands, Cyprus, the Dodecanese Islands, the Faroe Islands, Franz Josef Land, Gibraltar, Iceland, Madeira, Malta, Monaco, the North Aegean Islands, Novaya Zemlya, San Marino, Selvagens Islands, Svalbard and Jan Mayen, and Vatican City.

External links
Poecilus cupreus at Fauna Europaea

Pterostichinae
Beetles described in 1758
Taxa named by Carl Linnaeus